Carl Weyant (born October 4, 1983) is an American actor, writer, producer, model and musician who has appeared in Karma: Crime, Passion and Reincarnation, Elle: A Modern Cinderella Tale The Young and the Restless and recently worked with Danny Glover, Michael Rooker, and famed actor Martin Landau in the psychological thriller  Mysteria

Career

Shortly after arriving in Los Angeles, Weyant received roles in numerous low-budget independent features including Stray directed by Johnny Yong Bosch, and The Memory Thief. He then appeared as Thad Warner in The Young and the Restless. Since that time, Weyant has worked steadily in Hollywood, appearing in eleven films and day time TV Young and the restless.

In 2008, Weyant made his debut as the male lead in the film Karma: Crime, Passion, Reincarnation, which showed at the Cannes Film Festival in May 2008.

In 2009, Weyant went on to portray the role of Randy Dedd in the Dark comedy Dedd Brothers directed and written by Dustin Schuetter. Weyant and Schuetter would later go on and partner up on various features. Weyant then produced the family movie Elle: A Modern Cinderella Tale alongside John Dunson and Sean Dunson of Frame of Mind Entertainment. Elle won an audience award at the 2010 Newport Beach Film Festival.

During the end of 2009, Weyant formed Split | Vision| Entertainment for the production of full-length feature films. In 2010, Weyant partnered with Dustin Schuetter to co-develop, executive produce, produce and act on the award winning dark film Samuel Bleak, which starred Deborah Kara Unger, David Zayas, James Russo, Keith David and co-producer Dustin Schuetter. Samuel Bleak premiered at Cinequest Film Festival in the historic California Theatre on March 5, 2011, showed at the Sarasota Film Festival and competed at the First Santa Catalina Film Festival in Catalina, CA. Samuel Bleak has also been nominated for the 2011 which is sponsored by the U.S. Department of Health and Human Services, Substance Abuse and Mental Health Services Administration, and Center for Mental Health Services.  The Voice Awards honor leaders who have done exemplary work promoting the social inclusion of individuals with behavioral health problems.

Current 

 Weyant is currently producing Jake Stevens: The Last Protector with Dunson Twin Films for a theatrical release late 2014. According to an interview by Movie Vine, Weyant joined rock group Dead by Choice and is currently working on an untitled E.P. Weyant starred in the feature film Ashes of Eden in which is set to come out in theaters early 2014.

Filmography

References

External links
 
 
Officially Plugged In
 Times Of India
Screen India
Glam sham
Inferno: A Linda Lovelace Story
CineQuest 21
Mysteria
Monsters and Critics
MovieVine Interview
Geek Gossip
Movie Room Reviews

Living people
1983 births
American male film actors
21st-century American male actors
Male actors from New York City